Volkmar Sigusch (11 June 1940 – 7 February 2023) was a German sexologist, physician and sociologist. From 1973 to 2006, he was the director of the Institut für Sexualwissenschaft (Institute for Sexual Science) at the clinic of Goethe University in Frankfurt.

Sigusch was born in Bad Freienwalde. He studied medicine, psychology and philosophy (student of Max Horkheimer and Theodor W. Adorno) in Frankfurt am Main, Berlin and Hamburg. In 1966 and 1972, Sigusch got his German M. D. and Ph.D. at the university in Hamburg. He worked then since 1973 at the university in Frankfurt as professor. In 1972 he founded the Institute for Sexology at the University Hospital in Frankfurt and was its director until his retirement and the closure of the institute in 2006.

Sigusch wrote several books in sociology, psychology and sexual medicine. Sigusch is founder and since 1988, co-editor of the scientific, peer-reviewed journal Zeitschrift für Sexualforschung (Thieme Verlag Stuttgart and New York) and wrote articles for different magazines. From 1979 to 1986, he was editor of the cultural magazine Sexualität konkret.

In a 1991 publication "Die Transsexuellen und unser nosomorpher Blick" ("Transsexuals and our nosomorphic view"), Sigusch coined the term cissexual (zissexuell in German). As an antonym to transsexual, cissexual refers to a person whose gender identity matches their sex assigned at birth. Using a cis/trans dichotomy as transgender patois predates Sigusch back to 1914 with Ernst Burchard in Lexikon des gesamten Sexuallebens but only specifically in the context of cross-dressing, not gender identity.

Works 

Sigusch wrote over 600 scientific articles and 40 books, for example:

 Das Vorurteil gegenüber sexuell devianten Gruppen, 1967 (with Gunter Schmidt).
 Exzitation und Orgasmus bei der Frau, 1970.
 Tendenzen der Sexualforschung, 1970 (with Gunter Schmidt and Eberhard Schorsch).
 Arbeiter-Sexualität, 1971 (with Gunter Schmidt).
 Ergebnisse zur Sexualmedizin, 1972, 1973.
 Jugendsexualität, 1973 (with Gunter Schmidt).
 Die Zukunft der Monogamie, 1974 (with Gion Condrau, Jean-G. Lemaire).
 Therapie sexueller Störungen, 1975, 1980.
 Medizinische Experimente am Menschen, 1977, 1978.
 Sexualität und Medizin, 1979.
 Die sexuelle Frage, 1982.
 Vom Trieb und von der Liebe, 1984.
 Die Mystifikation des Sexuellen, 1984.
 Sexualtheorie und Sexualpolitik, 1984 (with Martin Dannecker).
 Sexualität konkret. Sammelband 2, 1984 (with Ingrid Klein and Hermann L. Gremliza).
 Operation AIDS, 1986.
 AIDS als Risiko, 1987.
 AIDS. Ergebnisse eines Kongresses, 1988 (with Steffen Fliegel).
 Kritik der disziplinierten Sexualität, 1989.
 Anti-Moralia, 1990.
 Geschlechtswechsel, 1992, 1993, 1995.
 Karl Heinrich Ulrichs. Der erste Schwule der Weltgeschichte, 2000.
 Freud und das Sexuelle. Neue psychoanalytische und sexualwissenschaftliche Perspektiven, 2005 (with Ilka Quindeau).
 Praktische Sexualmedizin: eine Einführung, 2005.
 Sexuelle Welten: Zwischenrufe eines Sexualforschers, 2005.
 Neosexualitäten: über den kulturellen Wandel von Liebe und Perversion, 2005.
 Sexuelle Störungen und ihre Behandlung, 1996, 1997, 2001, 2007.
 Geschichte der Sexualwissenschaft, 2008.
 Personenlexikon der Sexualforschung, 2009 (with Günter Grau).
Auf der Suche nach der sexuellen Freiheit. Über Sexualforschung u. Politik. Frankfurt a. M., New York 2011. 
mit Günter Amendt und Gunter Schmidt: Sex tells. Sexualforschung als Gesellschaftskritik. Hamburg, 2011. 
Sexualitäten. Eine kritische Theorie in 99 Fragmenten. Frankfurt a. M., New York 2013 –

External links 
 Literature by Volkmar Sigusch in German National Library
 Institute for Sexualwissenschaft
  Sigusch: The Neosexual Revolution. Archives of Sexual Behavior 27 (4), 331-359, 1998
 Sigusch: On Cultural Transformations on Sexuality and Gender in Recent Decades. German Medical Science 2, 1-31, 2004
 Article by Sigusch in Ärzteblatt
 Sigusch: Sexuelle Störungen und ihre Behandlung, 4. edition, 2007
 Article by Sigusch in Der Standard
 Article Jugend und Pornographie by Sigusch in Der Spiegel
 Der SPIEGEL, Sexologist Volkmar Sigusch, 2011

References 

1940 births
Academic staff of Goethe University Frankfurt
German psychologists
German sexologists
German sociologists
Living people
Psychology writers
German male writers